The men's club throw at the 2014 IPC Athletics European Championships was held at the Swansea University Stadium from 18–23 August.

Medalists

Results

F32

F51

See also
List of IPC world records in athletics

References

club throw
Club throw at the World Para Athletics European Championships